Dete Meserve is a film and television producer and novelist. She currently oversees worldwide business and creative properties for the film development, finance, and production company that has generated over $4 billion in revenue from its properties, which include hit television series Roseanne and Home Improvement and feature films like Want Women Want (starring Mel Gibson) and Where The Heart Is (starring Natalie Portman).

Meserve is also leading the company’s growing animation brands, including the PBS Kids series Ready Jet Go!, created by Craig Bartlett (Hey Arnold!,  Dinosaur Train) with Meserve as Executive Producer, and Not A Box, the animated TV series based on the award-winning book by Antoinette Portis and "Storywoods" based on the book series by Rebecca Dudley.

Meserve has produced numerous films and TV series and has been responsible for securing over $75 million in financing for film and TV properties. Her list of credits span award-winning television series such as Home Improvement and Saint George with George Lopez (Executive Producer) as well as hit movies What Women Want, the award-winning comedy Bernie (Producer), T he Keeping Room, and Where The Heart Is.  She is an executive producer on "What Men Want" which Paramount Pictures will release February 8, 2019.

Meserve is also the author of the best-selling and multi-award-winning novel “Good Sam,” about the search for an anonymous good samaritan who's leaving $100,000 on Los Angeles doorsteps.  The novel has won four national book awards and was adapted for a film starring Tiya Sircar as Kate Bradley which will launch on Netflix worldwide in Spring 2019. Kirkus Reviews calls Good Sam, "a solid, feel-good romance sparked with mystery." In addition, Meserve is the author of the sequel to "Good Sam," the bestseller “Perfectly Good Crime” recently won the Living Now Book Awards for “books that change the world.”  Her third bestselling novel, "The Space Between," was published by Lake Union Publishing in July 2018 and was a Once Upon A Book Club August Selection.

Her forthcoming book, Random Acts of Kindness,will be published on March 26, 2019. The true, inspiring tales in Random Acts of Kindness spotlight ordinary people from age nine to one hundred who have found unique ways to show compassion and make a difference. Prior to joining Wind Dancer Films, Meserve was Vice President of Classical KUSC, the University of Southern California’s radio network. She began her career as station Manager of the National Public Radio affiliate in Evansville, Indiana and assistant general manager of the PBS affiliate.

Originally a native of Chicago, Illinois, Meserve resides in Los Angeles with her husband and three kids.

Filmography
 Bernie (2011) - Producer
 As Cool As I Am (2013) - Producer
 The Keeping Room (2014) - Producer
 "Saint George" (2014) - Executive Producer
 "Ready Jet Go!" (2016) - Executive Producer
Good Sam (2019) - Producer, Writer, Author

References

American media executives
Living people
Year of birth missing (living people)